Jönåker is a locality situated in Nyköping Municipality, Södermanland County, Sweden with 617 inhabitants in 2010. Jönåker is known locally for being situated right on a steep hill by local standards and the trading house, the so-called "Kalle in the hill" former gas station. The railway passes through Jönåker, but trains do not stop there, instead twisting around the hill on the route between Nyköping and Norrköping.

Elections
Jönåker forms the Lunda constituency in Nyköping Municipality, named after the local church atop the hill that Jönåker sits beneath. Lunda is a swing district in that it can go the way of both traditional blocs, although it is solidly to the right of urban Nyköping throughout its history.

Parliament

References 

Populated places in Södermanland County
Populated places in Nyköping Municipality